Jonas Heed (born January 3, 1967) is a Swedish former professional ice hockey player. He was selected by the Chicago Blackhawks in the 6th round (116th overall) of the 1985 NHL Entry Draft.

Between 1984 and 1998, Heed played 316 regular season games in the Swedish Elitserien.

Personal information
His son, Tim Heed, who also plays defence, was drafted by the Anaheim Ducks in the 5th round of the 2010 NHL Entry Draft.

References

External links

1967 births
Living people
Chicago Blackhawks draft picks
Frölunda HC players
Södertälje SK players
Sportspeople from Västerås
Swedish ice hockey defencemen